Natalya Nazarova or Natalia Nazarova may refer to:

 Natalya Nazarova (born 1979), Russian track and field sprinter
 Natalia Nazarova (politician) (born 1953), Russian politician
  (born 1988), Russian volleyball player
  (born 1968), Russian actor, scenarist, and director
  (1949—2022), Soviet actor